Charles Stoddard may refer to:

Charles Warren Stoddard (1843–1909), American author and editor
Charles Stoddard, pen name of Charles S. Strong (1906–1962), American author
Charles Stoddard, pen name of Henry Kuttner
Charles G. Stoddard, of Stoddard-Dayton
Charles Fuller Stoddard, of the American Piano Company
Charles Stoddard, Director of the Bureau of Land Management from 1963 to 1966
Charles Stoddard, a character in A Child for Sale
Charles Dudley Stoddard, former owner of North River Wildlife Sanctuary
Charles A. Stoddard, US delegate to Second International Congress on Education of the Deaf in 1880